A speed reload (also known as a "combat reload") is the action of reloading a weapon in a very short amount of time by ejecting the currently loaded magazine with one hand, and drawing as well as loading fresh magazine with the other hand. This is quite similar to a regular reload of a weapon, but when well performed can have a large time advantage. The tactical advantage here is lost with closed bolt weapons that do not have a round in the chamber, as the gun will then require cocking with the new magazine inserted to chamber the new rounds. This does not apply to open bolt weapons, as they do not require charging. A speed reload is often thought to be more or less the opposite of a tactical reload.

Advantages and disadvantages

The main advantage of a speed reload is quite simply speed. If done correctly, it should take less than three seconds. Though this may vary slightly according to the firearm being used. 

A considerable disadvantage of performing a speed reload is that if there are rounds left in a shooter's ejected magazine, they will be lost. Additionally, it may be louder than a tactical reload, as the ejected magazine is left to fall.

See also
Tactical reload
Closed bolt
Open bolt

Firearms
Firearm techniques